When Lovers Part is an American silent film produced by Kalem Company and directed by Sidney Olcott with Gene Gauntier, Jack J. Clark, Robert Vignola and JP McGowan in the leading roles.

A copy is kept in the Desmet collection at Eye Film Institute (Amsterdam).

Plot 
In the Antebellum South, Nell is banned from seeing her lover by her father. They decide to elope, but their plans are thwarted by the father. When the American Civil War begins both Nell's father and former lover enlist the Confederate Army. Nell's father returns and her lover is traumatized and matured by the war, and at her father's funeral Nell finally accepts his hand in marriage.

Cast
 Gene Gauntier - Nell
 Jack J. Clark -
 Robert Vignola - Back servant
 JP McGowan - Nell's father

Production notes
The film was shot in Jacksonville, Florida.

References

External links

American Film Institute Catalog
 When Lovers Part website dedicated to Sidney Olcott
Film at YouTube

1910 films
Silent American drama films
American silent short films
Films set in Florida
Films shot in Jacksonville, Florida
Films directed by Sidney Olcott
1910 short films
1910 drama films
American black-and-white films
American Civil War films
1910s American films